Licciana Nardi is a comune (municipality) in the Province of Massa and Carrara in the Italian region Tuscany, located about  northwest of Florence and about  northwest of Massa.

Geography
The town lies in the Lunigiana region on the border between Tuscany and Liguria, with the Apuane Alps as a backdrop. It is only a few kilometres from Massa and La Spezia and near famous tourist spots as Lerici, Portovenere and the Cinque Terre. Licciana Nardi borders the following municipalities: Aulla, Bagnone, Comano, Fivizzano, Monchio delle Corti, Podenzana, Tresana, Villafranca in Lunigiana.

History
In 1933, Licciana was surnamed Nardi in honour of local Italian patriot Anacarsi Nardi (1800–1844).

Sister cities
  Somerton, United Kingdom
  Romagnat, France

References

Cities and towns in Tuscany